The 1991 Indonesia Open in badminton was held in Bandung, from July 10 to July 14, 1991. It was a five-star tournament and the prize money was US$135,000.

Final results

External links
Smash: 1991 Indonesian Open

Indonesia Open (badminton)
Indonesia
1991 in Indonesian sport
Bandung